The 1954 Victorian Football Association season was the 73rd season of the Australian rules football competition. The premiership was won by the Williamstown Football Club, after it defeated Port Melbourne by 32 points in the Grand Final on 2 October. It was Williamstown's sixth premiership, and the first of five premierships won in six seasons from 1954 until 1959.

Premiership 
The home-and-home season was played over twenty matches, before the top four clubs contested a finals series under the Page–McIntyre system to determine the premiers for the season.

Ladder

Finals

Awards 
 The leading goalkicker for the season was Peter Schofield (Moorabbin), who kicked 95 goals for the home-and-home season and 96 goals overall. Schofield sealed the title in Moorabbin's final home-and-home match for the season against Sandringham, in which he kicked 22 goals, including all sixteen of Moorabbin's second-half goals.
 The J. J. Liston Trophy was won by Ted Turner (Brighton), who polled 39 votes. Eric Simpson (Williamstown) was second with 31 votes; and George Gerry Collins (Oakleigh) was third with 31 votes, but behind Simpson on a countback.
 Moorabbin won the seconds premiership. Moorabbin 11.10 (76) defeated Williamstown 10.8 (68) in the Grand Final, played as a curtain raiser to the firsts Grand Final on 2 October.

Notable events 
 Former Brunswick player and delegate Alec Gillon became president of the Association at the annual general meeting in February 1954, challenging and defeating Lewis Page, who had served as president since 1951. Gillon went on to become the longest serving president of the Association, serving until 1981.
 Prior to the season, two soccer clubs attempted to gain partial occupancy of Association grounds. The Jugoslav United Soccer Team tendered an offer of £800 to the City of Prahran for the use of Toorak Park on alternate weekends during the season, a move which would have left the Prahran Football Club – which paid only £25 in rent for the year – without a venue for its seconds team to use; but the council rejected J.U.S.T's offer, citing its desire to remain loyal to Prahran as the reason. However, the Brighton Soccer Club was successful in securing a lease for alternate weekends at Elsternwick Park, sharing the venue with Brighton; in Brighton's case, the club's seconds already played at a different venue – Brighton Beach Oval – and it was Brighton's existing co-tenant, the Elsternwick Football Club from the Victorian Amateur Football Association, which was evicted as a result. It was the first time an Association club had been forced to share its ground with a club from a rival code, and it re-established grounds control as a major issue within the Association – ultimately escalating to the events of 1959, when the Association suspended Prahran after the council leased Toorak Park to the Victorian Rugby Union on alternate weekends.
 Despite having played as an amateur team since mid-1953 due to financial hardships, Northcote managed to reach the final four.

External links 
 List of VFA/VFL Premiers

References 

Victorian Football League seasons
VFL